The Association of European Journalists (founded 1961, San Remo) is an organisation promoting the interests of journalists involved in European affairs. It is an NGO in operational relations with UNESCO and enjoys consultative status in the Council of Europe. It has chapters in various countries across Europe.

References

External links
 Official website

Journalism-related professional associations
Organizations established in 1961
Pan-European trade and professional organizations